Timothy Chooi is a Canadian-American violinist and professor. He won the First Prize at the 2018 International Joseph Joachim Violin Competition and Second Prize at the 2019 Queen Elisabeth Competition. He has also won prizes at the International Yehudi Menuhin Violin Competition, Michael Hill International Violin Competition and the Grand Prize at the 2010 Montreal ManuLife Competition.

Early life and education

Chooi was born in Saanich, British Columbia to a Chinese-Indonesian mother and a Chinese-Malaysian father. As a young child, his father worked in Florida and Chooi moved and immigrated to the United States of America with his family. Chooi went on to complete high school in Pennsylvania and graduated with top honors in 2011. Chooi has one older brother, Nikki Chooi, who is a professional violinist and he previously served as the concertmaster of the Metropolitan Opera in New York City.

He received his Bachelor of Music degree from the Curtis Institute of Music studying with Ida Kavafian and Pamela Frank. Chooi went on to receive his Master of Music and Artist Diploma degree from the Juilliard School, studying with Catherine Cho and also his Professional Studies Diploma studying with Christian Tetzlaff at the Kronberg Academy in Germany. He has previously studied privately with Pinchas Zukerman and Patinka Kopec.

Career

Chooi started playing the violin at the age of three with the Suzuki method at the Victoria Conservatory of Music with Esther Tsang. He made his orchestral debut at the age of seven, performing with his brother and the Victoria Symphony Orchestra. In 2007, he was invited to perform with the Victoria Symphony Orchestra at the celebration concert "Splash" for an audience of over 50,000 people.

In 2010, he was accepted to the renowned Curtis Institute of Music in Philadelphia, Pennsylvania, where he studied with Ida Kavafian. A few months after enrolling, he was awarded the Grand Prize award at the 2010 Montreal ManuLife Competition and made his concerto debut with the Montreal Symphony Orchestra under the baton of Jean Francois Rivest. His performance was described as "the miracle violinist" by Montreal's harshest critic, Claude Gingras.
 
In 2018, Chooi was the first violinist and the first Canadian and American to win the Prix Yves-Paternot from the Verbier Festival bringing him a cash prize of 25,000 Swiss Francs with numerous concert appearances across Europe including a concert at the Verbier Festival.
 
Chooi rose to international attention when he won the first prize of the 2018 International Joseph Joachim Violin Competition in Hannover, Germany, bringing him a cash prize of €50,000, numerous concert engagements, a recording, and a three-year loan of the "1765" Guadagnini violin from the Fritz Behrens Foundation. He was the first Canadian to ever win the top prize. Shortly after, he won the Second Prize at the 2019 Queen Elisabeth Competition in Belgium and was immediately launched on a concert tour, performing with the Brussels Philharmonic under Stéphane Denève, and recitals across South Korea and Belgium. His most recent artistic collaboration was a tour with Anne-Sophie Mutter and the Mutter Virtuosi where they performed across Europe's greatest concert halls such as the Musikverein Vienna, Théâtre des Champs-Elysées, Berlin Philharmonie and many more. 

Over the years, Chooi has performed around the globe with NDR Radiophilharmonie, Deutsches Symphonie-Orchester Berlin,
Brussels Philharmonic, Chicago Symphony Orchestra, National Arts Centre Orchestra, Toronto Symphony Orchestra, Auckland Philharmonia, Montreal Symphony Orchestra, Santa Barbara Symphony and Sichuan Symphony Orchestra, among others. He has shared the international stage with artists and conductors such as Anne-Sophie Mutter, Pinchas Zukerman, Stéphane Denève, Lang Lang, Yuja Wang, Yoav Talmi, Carlos Miguel Prieto, Kent Nagano, and Benjamin Zander. 

He completed an Artist Diploma at the Juilliard School studying with Catherine Cho, and a Professional Studies diploma at the Kronberg Academy with Christian Tetzlaff.

In 2021, at the age of 27, Chooi was made the Professor of Violin at University of Ottawa (Canada), one of the youngest professors in the institution's history.

Instruments 
Timothy Chooi is currently performing on two violins–1741 “Titan” Guarneri Del Gesu violin which has been on loan to him from Canimex since 2023.  Chooi is also performing on 1709 "Engleman" Stradivarius as a recipient of the Nippon Music Foundation in Japan.

Awards
In 2010, Chooi was awarded the Grand Prize at the OSM Standard Life Competition (one of the youngest recipients in history).

2010 Grand Prize Winner of the Montreal ManuLife Competition, Montreal, Quebec, Canada
2012 Winner of the Canada Council for the Arts Music Instrument Bank, Toronto, Ontario, Canada
2013 Recipient of the Vadim Repin Scholarship Award
2014 Laureate of the 2014 International Yehudi Menuhin Violin Competition
2015 Bronze Medal at the 2015 Michael Hill International Violin Competition
2015 Winner of the Canada Council for the Arts Music Instrument Bank
2017 Milka Violin Award from the Curtis Institute of Music
2018 First Prize Winner of the Schadt Violin Competition
2018 Winner of the Canada Council for the Arts Music Instrument Bank
2018 Recipient of the "Prix Yves Paternot" from the Verbier Festival in Switzerland
2018 First Prize Winner of the International Joseph Joachim Violin Competition
2019 Second Prize Winner of the Queen Elisabeth Competition
2021 Recipient of the Nippon Music Foundation Rare Instrument Loan
2022 Recipient of the Norman Benzaquen Career Advancement Grant from The Juilliard School in New York City
2022 Recipient of the Gershen Cohen Violin Award The Juilliard School in New York City

See also
Nikki Chooi
List of Stradivarius instruments

References

External links

Menuhin International Competition for Young Violinists
Theviolinchannel.com
Afafestival.com
Cbc.ca
Cbc.ca

1993 births
Living people
21st-century Canadian male musicians
21st-century classical violinists
Canadian classical violinists
Canadian expatriate musicians in the United States
Canadian people of Chinese descent
Curtis Institute of Music alumni
Male classical violinists
Musicians from Victoria, British Columbia
Naturalized citizens of the United States
Prize-winners of the Queen Elisabeth Competition
21st-century Canadian violinists and fiddlers
Canadian male violinists and fiddlers